Stefan Koubek was the defending champion but lost in the first round to Carlos Moyá.

Jan-Michael Gambill won in the final 7–5, 6–4 against Xavier Malisse.

Seeds

  Patrick Rafter (quarterfinals)
  Nicolás Lapentti (second round)
  Carlos Moyá (second round)
  Jan-Michael Gambill (champion)
  Gastón Gaudio (first round)
  Álex Calatrava (second round)
  Byron Black (withdrew)
  Fabrice Santoro (quarterfinals)

Draw

Finals

Top half

Bottom half

External links
 2001 Citrix Tennis Championships Main draw

2001
2001 ATP Tour
2001 Citrix Tennis Championships